Paul Starrett (1866–1957) was an American builder. In 1883, he graduated from Lake Forest Academy, an elite boarding school for boys which was part of the Lake Forest, Illinois, educational experiment. His brothers also graduated from this institution. As head of Starrett Brothers, Inc., in New York City, he was responsible for the construction of the Empire State Building, the Flatiron Building, and Penn Station, as well as the Plaza and Biltmore hotels. The Lincoln Memorial in Washington, D.C. was one of his many other projects.

Further reading
Changing the Skyline - Paul Starrett's 1938 autobiography.

External links
Paul Starrett at the Columbia Encyclopedia

Lake Forest Academy alumni
1866 births
1957 deaths
American real estate businesspeople